Elachista aerinella is a moth of the family Elachistidae. It is found in the United States, where it has been recorded from Arizona and California.

References

aerinella
Moths described in 1999
Moths of North America
Taxa named by Lauri Kaila
Organisms named after Tolkien and his works